Major General Sir Eric Stanley Girdwood, KBE, CB, CMG (14 October 1876 – 24 May 1963) was a British military officer who served as General Officer Commanding the Northern Ireland District from 1931 to 1935.

Military career

Educated at the Belfast Royal Academy, Girdwood was commissioned into the Cameronians (Scottish Rifles) as a second lieutenant on 20 May 1899. He served in the Second Boer War in South Africa with the 2nd battalion of his regiment. They took part in the Ladysmith relief force, including the battles of Colenso (December 1899), Vaal Krantz (February 1900) and the Tugela Heights (February 1900). During this advance, he was promoted to lieutenant on 25 January 1900. He served in the Natal from March to June 1900. Following the end of the war, he left South Africa for England in July 1902.

He also served in World War I, having been appointed a Brigade Major with the Scottish Rifles Brigade in 1911. He fought with his regiment at Gallipoli, becoming Commander of the 156th (Scottish Rifles) Brigade in Egypt and Palestine in 1916. He was made General Officer Commanding 74th (Yeomanry) Division in Palestine and France later that year.

After the War he was appointed Commander 9th Infantry Brigade and then GOC 3rd Division in 1919. He was made Commander of Military Forces in Iraq in 1924 and GOC Bombay District of India in 1926. He was appointed Commandant of the Royal Military College Sandhurst in 1927 and GOC Northern Ireland District in 1931; he retired in 1935.

References

|-

1876 births
1963 deaths
British Army major generals
People educated at the Belfast Royal Academy
Knights Commander of the Order of the British Empire
Companions of the Order of the Bath
Companions of the Order of St Michael and St George
Cameronians officers
Military personnel from Belfast
British Army personnel of the Second Boer War
British Army generals of World War I
Commandants of Sandhurst